The sanctuary of Fortuna Primigenia was an ancient Roman, religious complex in Praeneste (now Palestrina, 35 km east of Rome) founded in 204 BC by Publius Sempronius Tuditanus. The temple within the sanctuary was dedicated to the goddess , or Fortune of the First Born.

The remains of the sanctuary still standing today were built sometime around 120 BC as a spectacular series of terraces, exedras and porticos on four levels down the hillside, linked by monumental stairs and ramps. The inspiration for this feat of integrated urbanistic design lay not in republican Rome but in the Hellenistic monarchies of the eastern Mediterranean, such as the sanctuaries of Delos and Kos. Praeneste foreshadowed the grandiose Imperial style of the following generation.

The sanctuary of Fortune occupies a series of five vast terraces, which, resting on gigantic masonry substructures and connected with each other by grand staircases, rise one above the other on the hill in the form of the side of a pyramid, crowned on the highest terrace by the round temple of Fortune, today incorporated into the Palazzo Colonna Barberini. This immense edifice, probably by far the largest sanctuary in Italy, must have presented a most imposing aspect, visible as it was from a great part of Latium, from Rome, and even from the sea.

The oracle continued to be consulted down to Christian times, until Constantine the Great, and again later Theodosius I, forbade the practice and closed the temple.

Features of the temple influenced Roman garden design on steeply sloped sites through Antiquity and once again in Italian villa gardens from the 15th century. The monument to Victor Emmanuel II in Rome owes a lot to the Praeneste sanctuary complex.

See also
List of Ancient Roman temples
The Nile mosaic

References

Temples of Fortuna
3rd-century BC religious buildings and structures
Destroyed temples
Roman sites in Lazio
Buildings and structures in the Metropolitan City of Rome Capital